Kareh Rud Khan (also Romanized as Kareh Rūd Khān) is a village in Otaqvar Rural District, Otaqvar District, Langarud County, Gilan Province, Iran. At the 2006 census, its population was 63, in 20 families.

References 

Populated places in Langarud County